Tim Rushlow is the solo debut album of American country music artist Tim Rushlow, formerly co-lead vocalist of the country music band Little Texas. Released in February 2001 on Atlantic Records, it is also his only solo album, although he did release another album and two singles in the band Rushlow, as well as two more singles in the duo Rushlow Harris. Tim Rushlow accounted for four singles on the Billboard country singles charts, including "She Misses Him", his only Top 40 country hit. After Atlantic Records shut down, the album was re-released in 2002 on The Scream Recordings Label and retitled Crazy Life after the song of same. An extra track, "As Real as Forever" was included.

Content
Four singles were released from Tim Rushlow: "When You Love Me", "She Misses Him", "Crazy Life", and "Love, Will" (which was re-titled "Love, Will (The Package)" upon release to radio). Of these, "She Misses Him" was the only one to chart in the Top 40 on the Billboard country singles charts, peaking at #8. Several of the tracks on this album were written by Little Texas guitarist Porter Howell. "In the Meantime" was also recorded by its co-writer Sherrié Austin on her 2001 album Followin' a Feelin', released in March 2001. Austin's version was released as a single in 2002 but failed to chart.

Track listing

Personnel
As listed in liner notes
Ron Block – banjo
Richard Brannan – bass guitar
Eric Darken – percussion
Larry Franklin – fiddle, mandolin
Paul Franklin – Dobro, steel guitar
Tommy Harden – drums
Aubrey Haynie – fiddle, mandolin
Wes Hightower – background vocals
Jeff King – electric guitar
Paul Leim – drums
B. James Lowry – acoustic guitar
Brent Mason – electric guitar
Jerry McPherson – electric guitar
Jimmy Nichols – piano, keyboards, background vocals
Russ Pahl – steel guitar

Chart performance

References

[ Tim Rushlow] at Allmusic

2001 debut albums
Atlantic Records albums
Tim Rushlow albums
Albums produced by David Malloy